This page lists all appeals to  the Judicial Committee of the Privy Council from the Canadian courts, decided in the years 1880 to 1889.

From 1867 to 1949, the JCPC was the highest court of appeal for Canada (and, separately, for Newfoundland). During this period, its decisions on Canadian appeals were binding precedent on all Canadian courts, including the Supreme Court of Canada. Any decisions from this era that the Supreme Court of Canada has not overruled since gaining appellate supremacy in 1949 remain good law, and continue to bind all Canadian courts other than the Supreme Court.

The Parliament of Canada abolished appeals to the JCPC of criminal cases in 1933 and civil cases in 1949. Ongoing cases that had begun before those dates remained appealable to the JCPC. The final JCPC ruling on a Canadian case was rendered in 1959, in Ponoka-Calmar Oils v Wakefield.

1880–1889

Summary by year and result

Summary by jurisdiction and court appealed from

See also
 List of Canadian appeals to the Judicial Committee of the Privy Council, 1867–1869
 List of Canadian appeals to the Judicial Committee of the Privy Council, 1870–1879
 List of Canadian appeals to the Judicial Committee of the Privy Council, 1890–1899
 List of Canadian appeals to the Judicial Committee of the Privy Council, 1900–1909
 List of Canadian appeals to the Judicial Committee of the Privy Council, 1910–1919
 List of Canadian appeals to the Judicial Committee of the Privy Council, 1920–1929
 List of Canadian appeals to the Judicial Committee of the Privy Council, 1930–1939
 List of Canadian appeals to the Judicial Committee of the Privy Council, 1940–1949
 List of Canadian appeals to the Judicial Committee of the Privy Council, 1950–1959

Sources

 British and Irish Legal Information Institute: Privy Council Decisions
 1880 Privy Council Decisions
 1881 Privy Council Decisions
 1882 Privy Council Decisions
 1883 Privy Council Decisions
 1884 Privy Council Decisions
 1885 Privy Council Decisions
 1886 Privy Council Decisions
 1887 Privy Council Decisions
 1888 Privy Council Decisions
 1889 Privy Council Decisions

References

1880s in Canada
Canadian case law lists
Canada